Goszczyn  is a village in Grójec County, Masovian Voivodeship, in east-central Poland. It is the seat of the gmina (administrative district) called Gmina Goszczyn.

The village has a population of 920.

References

Goszczyn